Yuki Yoshidome (born 2 August 1998) is a Japanese female handball player for Hokkoku Bank and the Japanese national team.

She represented Japan at the 2021 World Women's Handball Championship in Spain.

References

1998 births
Living people
Japanese female handball players